Gemini News was a 24-hour news channel from the Sun TV Network of India. The channel was launched in May 2004 with much publicity, but it failed to attract viewers. Critics have blamed poor technical standards for the channel's lack of popularity. The Sun Network is to revamp the service. They had appointed Satish Babu, who helped improve the ratings of MAA TV's news bulletins, as the channel's new chief. Satish Babu was with the channel for a short stint. Gemini News channel is continuing to be successful in AP media due to Gemini TV. Gemini News was closed on 1 February 2019 and on 3 February 2019 Gemini News was replaced by Bengali General Entertainment Channel, Sun Bangla.

References

External links 
 Gemini News Official site

Television channels and stations established in 2004
Television stations in Hyderabad